Giovanni Pessina (Bergamo, 18361904) was an Italian painter. Described in contemporary documents as a painter of perspective and an internista (interior painter), he specialized in vedute of interiors in a precise, realist style.

Biography
He studied at the Brera Academy and was a pupil of Luigi Bisi. 

In 1872 at Milan, he exhibited canvas depicting Choir of the church of the Monastero Maggiore in Milan, and interior of Sacristy of the church of San Vittore al Corso. At the Esposizione of Fine Arts at Turin, in 1880, he displayed the interior of the Abby of Chiaravalle. The Galleria d'Arte Moderna of Milan has two paintings by Pessina: Interno del Duomo di Milano (1862) and Interno della sagrestia di San Vittore Grande a Milano (1865). A painting of the  September 4, 1864, ceremony awarding honorary membership in the Pio Istituto Tipografico of Milan to Alessandro Manzoni, was located in said institute.

References

1836 births
1904 deaths
Brera Academy alumni
Painters from Bergamo
19th-century Italian painters
Italian male painters
20th-century Italian painters
Italian vedutisti
19th-century Italian male artists
20th-century Italian male artists